First Baptist Academy may refer to:

First Baptist Academy of Dallas, Texas, United States
First Baptist Academy (Houston, Texas), United States